Front Porch Stories is Avail's sixth studio album, released on Fat Wreck Chords in 2002. It was the band's final album.

Track listing
 "Black and Red" - 2:15
 "Blue Times Two" - 2:56
 "West Wye" - 2:55
 "You" - 2:47
 "Gravel to Dirt" - 2:10
 "Done Reckoning" - 1:42
 "East on Main" - 2:28
 "Versus" - 3:04
 "Subdued and Arrested" - 2:40
 "Monuments" - 1:54
 "The Falls" - 3:36
 "Now" - 3:33

References

Avail albums
2002 albums
Fat Wreck Chords albums